Briazz was a Seattle based sandwich restaurant chain founded in 1995.  At one time its stores reached across America as far as Chicago, San Francisco, and Los Angeles.

In June, 2004, Briazz filed for Chapter 11 bankruptcy protection.  Then in April, 2005, Organic To Go won an auction to buy most of Briazz's assets for $1.35 million.  Organic To Go was to replace the Briazz brand with its own at 12 out of the 15 existing Briazz locations.

References

Defunct companies based in Seattle
Restaurants established in 1995
Restaurants disestablished in 2005
Companies that filed for Chapter 11 bankruptcy in 2004
Defunct restaurant chains in the United States
1995 establishments in Washington (state)
2005 disestablishments in Washington (state)